"At the Club" is a song by American singer Jacquees featuring American rapper Dej Loaf. It was first released on February 10, 2017 from their collaborative mixtape Fuck a Friend Zone, before being released as a single on September 29, 2017.

Composition
The song was produced by W$Kharri, using "harp-like chords and squelching synths over a simple drum pattern". Jacquees sings about meeting a girl at a club, while Dej Loaf sings about being a "ride or die girlfriend".

Music video
A music video for the song was released on September 29, 2017. Directed by Benny Boom, the video begins with Jacquees getting his hair done in the studio and Dej Loaf applying makeup, before they go to the club in a Lamborghini and partying in the VIP section.

Charts

Certifications

References

2017 singles
2017 songs
Jacquees songs
Dej Loaf songs
Songs written by Dej Loaf
Cash Money Records singles